The Carilo Open, or the Abierto de Cariló, was a golf tournament on the TPG Tour, the official professional golf tour in Argentina. First held in 1983, it has always been held at the Carilo Golf Club, in Cariló, Buenos Aires Province.

The tournament not held in 1985, 1986, 1988, 1989, and from 1991 to 2000.

Winners

External links
TPG Tour – official site

Golf tournaments in Argentina